Silkworm was an American indie rock band active from 1987 to 2005 whose core members were Tim Midyett, Andy Cohen, and Michael Dahlquist.

History

Origins: 1985–1987
Founding members Tim Midyett (formerly Midgett), Joel RL Phelps, and Andy Cohen began writing and performing under the name Ein Heit in Missoula, Montana from 1985 to 1987. In 1987, they adopted the name Silkworm.

Relocation: 1987–1990 
They relocated to Seattle in 1990, where they met drummer Michael Dahlquist. During a radio interview on WNUR at Northwestern University, Steve Albini called in to contact the band. Albini had attended Hellgate High School, the same high school that Phelps, Midyett, and Cohen attended in Missoula, Montana. This connection led to Albini recording the band's album In the West. Phelps left the band in 1994 due to mental health issues and the rigors of touring.

Matt Kadane of Bedhead and The New Year played keyboards on Italian Platinum and It'll Be Cool.

Breakup: 2005
Drummer Michael Dahlquist was killed on July 14, 2005 when his car was rammed from behind. Friends Douglas Meis (Exo, the Dials) and John Glick (Returnables) were also killed in the crash.

Later projects: 2005–present 
After Dahlquist's death, Midyett and Cohen went on to form Bottomless Pit.

A feature-length documentary, Couldn't You Wait? The Story of Silkworm, was released in February 2013, featuring interviews with Jeff Tweedy, Steve Albini, Stephen Malkmus, Gerard Cosloy, Clint Conley, and others.

A remastered and expanded 2x12" + CD edition of the third Silkworm album Libertine including the group's "Marco Collins Sessions" and two additional tracks was issued by the label Comedy Minus One in May 2014.

Discography

Studio albums
Advantage (1987)
Girl Harbrr (1989)
L'ajre (1992)
In The West (1994)
Libertine (1994)
Firewater (1996)
Developer (1997)
Blueblood (1998)
Lifestyle (2000)
Italian Platinum (2002)
It'll Be Cool (2004)

Compilations
Even A Blind Chicken Finds A Kernel of Corn Now And Then: 1990-1994 (1998, Matador Records)

Singles and EPs
"Slipstream" b/w "Inside Outside" 7" (Punchdrunk, 1991)
"The Chain" b/w "Our Secret" 7" (Temporary Freedom, 1992)
"Violet" b/w "Around A Light" 7" (Blatant, 1993)
His Absence Is A Blessing 12" EP (Stampede, 1993)
"In The Bleak Midwinter" b/w Engine Kid's "The Little Drummer Boy" (split Christmas single, C/Z, 1993)
"Into The Woods" b/w "Incaduce California" 7" (Rockamundo, 1993)
"Couldn't You Wait" b/w "The Grand Tour" 7" (Matador, 1995)
"The Marco Collins Session" 7"/CD EP
"Quicksand" b/w "On The Road, One More Time" 7" (My Pal God, 1996)
"Never Met A Man I Didn't Like" b/w "You Ain't Goin' Nowhere" 7" (Matador 1997)
"The Other Side" b/w "I Must Pianner", "I Must Prepare" 7" (Moneyshot, 1998)
You Are Dignified CD EP (12XU, 2003)
Chokes! CD EP (12XU, 2006)

References

External links
Official web site
"Couldn't You Wait: The Story of Silkworm" documentary website
Episode 105 - Conan Neutron's Protonic Reversal w/Tim Midyett

American indie rock groups
Musical groups established in 1987
Musical groups disestablished in 2005
C/Z Records artists
Matador Records artists
Touch and Go Records artists
My Pal God Records artists
Musical groups from Montana